Gnas is a municipality in the district of Südoststeiermark in the Austrian state of Styria.

Population
All figures based on the 2015 area.

References

Cities and towns in Südoststeiermark District